AKM Bazlur Rahman was an Awami League politician and recipient of the Independence Day Award, the highest civilian award in Bangladesh.

Career 
Rahman was a founding member of Bangladesh Chhatra League in 1948.

In 1954, Rahman worked as the campaign manager of the United Front's candidate in Raipura, Narsingdi District. He was elected Secretary of the Narsingdi District unit of the Awami League in 1955.

In 1965, Rahman was the secretary of the Dhaka District unit of Awami League.

After the Assassination of Sheikh Mujibur Rahman, President of Bangladesh and Awami League, in the 15 August 1975 Bangladesh coup d'état Bazlur Rahman was detained and tortured by the new regime. Rahman was paralyzed due to the torture.

Death 
Rahman died on 8 February 1988. He was awarded the Independence Day Award posthumously in 2021 for his contribution to the Bangladesh Liberation War.

References 

1930 births
1988 deaths
Awami League politicians
Recipients of the Independence Day Award